Hohatzenheim (Alsatian: Àtzne) is a former commune in the Bas-Rhin department in north-eastern France. On 1 January 2016, it was merged into the new commune Wingersheim-les-Quatre-Bans.

Population

Pilgrimage church
Surrounded by farmland stands a pilgrimage church, restored in 1888.   By 1916 it had fallen into disrepair and had to be renewed.

See also
 Communes of the Bas-Rhin department

References

Former communes of Bas-Rhin
Bas-Rhin communes articles needing translation from French Wikipedia
Populated places disestablished in 2016